Yun Chae-rin (born 16 October 1990) is a South Korean freestyle skier. She competed in the women's moguls event at the 2006 Winter Olympics.

References

1990 births
Living people
South Korean female freestyle skiers
Olympic freestyle skiers of South Korea
Freestyle skiers at the 2006 Winter Olympics
Place of birth missing (living people)